Larry Stevens "Steven" Furtick Jr. (born February 19, 1980) is an American Baptist evangelical Christian pastor, author, and songwriter of Elevation Worship. He is the founder and senior pastor of Elevation Church, based in  Charlotte North Carolina .

Early life and education 

Furtick was born and raised in Moncks Corner, South Carolina, and attended Berkeley High School. At the age of 16, after reading the book Fresh Wind, Fresh Fire by Jim Cymbala, he felt called to pastor a church in a major city. He studied at North Greenville University in communication and earned a Bachelor of Arts, then he studied at Southern Baptist Theological Seminary and earned a Master of Divinity.

Ministry 

In 2004, Furtick served as worship leader at Christ Covenant Church in Shelby, North Carolina. In 2006, he moved to Charlotte, North Carolina and founded Elevation Church with seven families and his own. The church had their first service on February 5, 2006.

In 2007, he helped found the music group Elevation Worship as a songwriter and since has been nominated for GMA Dove and Grammy Awards, winning a Grammy for their album, Old Church Basement.

In 2007, he made headlines when his church gave $40,000 to members in envelopes with $5, $20, and even $1,000, telling them to spend it kindly on others.

Furtick speaks at events all over the world including the 2011 Global Leadership Summit hosted by Bill Hybels, the C3 Conference 2012 hosted by Ed Young Jr., the Hillsong Conference 2012 hosted by Brian Houston, and the Presence Conference in 2012 and 2013 hosted by Phil Pringle. Furtick also participated in The Elephant Room 1 and The Elephant Room 2 hosted by James MacDonald.  Furtick was named to Oprah's SuperSoul100 list of visionaries and influential leaders in 2016.

In 2012, in response to a need of mentorship for 1,000 students in area schools, Furtick launched an outreach program at Elevation Church called the M1 Initiative. Furtick said, "We have always said we want to be a blessing to our city and support our leaders with a volunteer force they can count on." More than 1,600 members responded and committed to mentoring a child for the 2012–2013 school year.

Furtick has committed to donating 12 percent of Elevation Church's giving to support outreach efforts nationally and globally.

Public life and media 
Furtick is a New York Times best selling author. He has also participated in various philanthropic campaigns, donating  clothes and furniture to families in need.

Pastor Steven Furtick has known associations with pastors like T.D. Jakes and Joel Osteen, both commonly referenced figures in relation to Prosperity theology.

In 2013, Furtick refused to answer questions about his salary, his tax-free housing allowance, and how much he makes from books and speaking fees, and how the church is governed. Elevation has stated that Furtick is generous to the church with the money he receives from writing books—that he arranges for the church to purchase his books directly from the publisher, allowing Elevation to receive the author's discount and keep the money from sales. They have also reported that the publisher pays the church to produce marketing materials to promote Furtick's books. Elevation has confirmed that Furtick's salary is set by a Board of Overseers composed of other megachurch pastors, who vote on his salary based on a compensation study conducted by an outside firm, and that Furtick does not vote on his own salary.

On October 2, 2020, Trinity Broadcasting Network began airing programming from Furtick, replacing the Kenneth Copeland ministries program "Believer's Voice of Victory".

Bibliography

Awards and nominations

GMA Dove Awards 

|-
| rowspan="2" | 2017
| rowspan="2" | "O Come to the Altar" 
| Song of the Year
| 
|-
| Worship Song of the Year
| 
|-
| 2018
| "Do It Again" 
| Worship Song of the Year
| 
|-
| rowspan="2" | 2020
| "See a Victory" 
| Song of the Year
| 
|-
| "The Blessing (Live)" 
| Worship Recorded Song of the Year
| 
|-
| rowspan="10" | 2021
| "Graves into Gardens" 
| rowspan="2" | Song of the Year
| 
|-
| "The Blessing" 
| 
|-
| Himself
| Songwriter of the Year (Non-artist)
| 
|-
| "Never Lost" 
| Contemporary Gospel Recorded Song of the Year
| 
|-
| "Tumbas A Jardines" 
| Spanish Language Recorded Song of the Year
| 
|-
| "Graves into Gardens" 
| rowspan="2" | Worship Recorded Song of the Year
| 
|-
| "Jireh" 
| 
|-
| Graves into Gardens 
| rowspan="2" | Worship Album of the Year
| 
|-
| Old Church Basement 
| 
|-
| Living Color 
| Children's Album of the Year
| 
|-
| rowspan="5" | 2022
| rowspan="2" | "Jireh" 
| Song of the Year
| 
|-
| Worship Recorded Song of the Year
| 
|-
| "Rattle!" 
| Song of the Year
| 
|-
| rowspan="2" | Lion 
| Worship Album of the Year
| 
|-
| Recorded Music Packaging of the Year
| 
|-
|}

Grammy Awards

References

External links 
StevenFurtick.com

1980 births
Baptist ministers from the United States
Living people
Southern Baptist ministers
People from Moncks Corner, South Carolina
Southern Baptist Theological Seminary alumni
North Greenville University alumni
American Christian writers